The 2016 Nordic Naturals Challenger was a professional tennis tournament played on hard courts. It was the 29th edition of the tournament which was part of the 2016 ATP Challenger Tour. It took place in Aptos, California, United States between 8 and 14 August 2016.

Singles main-draw entrants

Seeds

 1 Rankings are as of August 1, 2016.

Other entrants
The following players received wildcards into the singles main draw:
  Christopher Eubanks
  Tom Fawcett
  Clay Thompson 
  Mackenzie McDonald

The following players received entry from the qualifying draw:
  John Lamble
  Cameron Norrie
  Eric Quigley
  Raymond Sarmiento

The following player received entry as a lucky loser:
  Alexios Halebian

Champions

Singles

  Daniel Evans def.  Cameron Norrie, 6–3, 6–4

Doubles

  Nicolaas Scholtz /  Tucker Vorster def.  Mackenzie McDonald /  Ben McLachlan, 6–7(5–7), 6–3, [10–8]

References
Official Website

External links
ITF Search
ATP official site

Nordic Naturals Challenger
Nordic Naturals Challenger
Nordic
Com